The Aylesbury Clock Tower is located at the centre of Aylesbury, Buckinghamshire, United Kingdom's Market Square was built in 1876. It dominates the square and stands on the site of a former market house which was demolished in 1866.

The tower was designed by architect D Brandon who also designed other public buildings in the town including the Corn Exchange.

References

Clock towers in the United Kingdom
Towers in Buckinghamshire
Towers completed in 1876